A special election was held in  in 1824 to fill a vacancy left by the resignation of Thomas W. Cobb (C-DR) upon his election to the Senate

Election results

Wilde took his seat February 7, 1825

See also
List of special elections to the United States House of Representatives

References

Georgia 1824 At-large
Georgia 1824 At-large
1824 At-large
Georgia At-large
1824 Georgia (U.S. state) elections
United States House of Representatives 1824 at-large